The Carnegie Hall Concerts: January 1943 is a live album by American pianist, composer and bandleader Duke Ellington recorded at Carnegie Hall, in New York City in 1943 and released on the Prestige label in 1977.

Reception
The AllMusic review by Scott Yanow awarded the album 5 stars and stated: "This two-CD set captures one of the milestones in Duke Ellington's long and extremely productive career, highlighted by his monumental suite "Black, Brown and Beige" in the only full-length version ever recorded by his orchestra... Every serious jazz library should contain this set".

Track listing
All compositions (and arrangements) by Duke Ellington except as indicated
 "The Star-Spangled Banner" (Francis Scott Key, John Stafford Smith) - 1:12  
 "Black and Tan Fantasy" (Ellington, James "Bubber" Miley) - 6:35  
 "Rockin' in Rhythm" (Harry Carney, Ellington, Irving Mills) - 4:12  
 "Moon Mist" - 3:38  
 "Jumpin' Punkins" - 3:24  
 "A Portrait of Bert Williams" - 2:56  
 "Bojangles" - 3:17  
 "Portrait of Florence Mills (Black Beauty)" - 3:40  
 "Ko-Ko" - 2:23  
 "Dirge" (Billy Strayhorn) - 3:28  
 "Stomp (Johnny Come Lately)" (Strayhorn) - 2:59  
 "Are You Sticking?" - 3:13  
 "Black [First Movement of Black, Brown and Beige]" - 21:52  
 "Brown [Second Movement of Black Brown and Beige]" - 11:49  
 "Beige [Third Movement of Black, Brown and Beige]" - 14:34  
 "Bakiff" (Ellington, Juan Tizol) - 6:36  
 "Jack the Bear" - 3:19  
 "Blue Belles of Harlem" - 6:09  
 "Cotton Tail" - 3:11  
 "Day Dream" (Ellington, John La Touche, Strayhorn) - 4:02  
 "Boy Meets Horn" (Ellington, Rex Stewart) - 5:58  
 "Rose of the Rio Grande" (Ross Gorman, Edgar Leslie, Harry Warren) - 2:33  
 "Don't Get Around Much Anymore" (Ellington, Bob Russell) - 4:39  
 "Going Up" - 3:56  
 "Mood Indigo" (Barney Bigard, Ellington, Mills) - 4:38  
Recorded at Carnegie Hall in New York on January 23, 1943.

Personnel
Duke Ellington – piano (all tracks exc. 10 & 11) 
Billy Strayhorn - piano (tracks 10 & 11)
Rex Stewart - cornet
Shorty Baker, Wallace Jones - trumpet
Ray Nance - trumpet, violin
Lawrence Brown, Joe Nanton - trombone
Juan Tizol - valve trombone
Otto Hardwicke - alto saxophone, clarinet 
Johnny Hodges - alto saxophone
Chauncy Haughton - clarinet, tenor saxophone
Ben Webster - tenor saxophone
Harry Carney - baritone saxophone, clarinet, alto saxophone
Fred Guy - guitar
Junior Raglin - bass
Sonny Greer - drums

References

Duke Ellington live albums
1977 live albums
Live orchestral jazz albums
Prestige Records live albums
Albums recorded at Carnegie Hall